Khaled Kabub (Hebrew: חאלד כבוב, born 1958) is an Israeli-Arab judge. Kabub was appointed in 2022 at the Supreme Court of Israel becoming its first Muslim member.

Biography
Khaled Kabub was born in Jaffa to a Muslim family. His father was a bus driver for the Dan bus company. After graduating from high school in 1975, he studied at Tel Aviv University, completing a BA in History and Islam in 1981 and a BA in Law in 1988. In 2011, he completed a master's degree in commercial law with honors, which was awarded jointly by Tel Aviv University and the University of California, Berkeley.

Legal career
From 1989 to 1997, he worked as a  lawyer in private practice. In September 1997, he was appointed a judge on the Netanya Magistrate's Court, and in 2003, he was appointed a judge on the Tel Aviv District Court. Since that year, he has also taught courses in corporations and economics at Bar-Ilan University and Ono Academic College. In August 2010, he was appointed to serve in the economics department of the court. In 2014, he was added to the list of candidates for the Supreme Court.

Kabub gained a reputation as an outstanding jurist in the economic, civil, and criminal fields. Notable cases he tried include those of business magnate Nochi Dankner, who he sentenced to two years imprisonment and a NIS 800,000 fine for securities fraud, and director of the Israel Electric Corporation Dan Cohen, who he sentenced to six years imprisonment and a NIS 10 million fine for fraud, breach of trust, and obstruction of justice,

Kabub was a candidate to replace Supreme Court judge Yoram Danziger upon his retirement in February 2018. Two days before the selection committee was scheduled to meet to make its decision, he withdrew his candidacy.

In February 2022, Kabub was selected to join the Supreme Court, becoming its first permanent Muslim judge.

References

Living people
1958 births
Arab citizens of Israel
20th-century Israeli judges
People from Jaffa
Academic staff of Ono Academic College
Tel Aviv University alumni
University of California, Berkeley alumni
Academic staff of Bar-Ilan University
21st-century Israeli judges